Richard A. Moynihan (January 8, 1902 – October 8, 1991) was an American football player. 

A native of Haverhill, Massachusetts, Moynihan played college football for Villanova. He played professional football in the National Football League (NFL) for the Frankford Yellow Jackets during 1927 season. He played at the fullback and blocking back positions and appeared in a total of nine NFL games, four as a starter.

References

1902 births
1991 deaths
People from Haverhill, Massachusetts
American football fullbacks
Villanova Wildcats football players
Frankford Yellow Jackets players
Players of American football from Massachusetts